The Saskatchewan Archaeological Society is a society of amateur and professional archaeologists who encourage the preservation of archaeological artifacts and sites, publish, educate and assist the public in the interest of archaeological activities.  As well, the Saskatchewan Archaeological Society assists in the formation of local branches of archaeological communities such as the Regina Archaeological Society.  Many of the archaeology sites of Saskatchewan are of aboriginal ancestry and include rock paintings, habitation sites, medicine wheels, as well as kill and processing sites. Archaeology focuses on the anthropological study of human history and lifestyle using artifacts.

Saskatchewan Archaeological Sites

According to the 'Map of Saskatchewan Archaeology', there are more than 20,000 archaeological sites in Saskatchewan. The Saskatchewan Heritage Branch of the Saskatchewan Government manages the archaeological site files. An introduction to some of the archaeological sites around and about Saskatchewan are:

 Stanley Mission : Aboriginal History
 The Aboriginal Rock Paintings of the Churchill River : Aboriginal History
 Waterway sites such as : Sjovold Site south of Outlook
Ancient Echoes Interpretive Centre at Herschel: Consists of petroglyph, paleontology, aboriginal and pre-historic/dinosaur finds
 Wanuskewin Heritage Park Archaeological Interest near Saskatoon
 St. Victor Petroglyphs Saskatchewan Provincial Park
 Bushfield West site near Nipawin
 Fort Pelly and other historic Trading Post sites
 Rescue Archaeology Excavation Doukhobor Kirilovka Village Site

See also

List of archaeological sites sorted by country 
List of archaeologists
List of archaeological periods
Prehistory
GIS in archaeology
Excavation
Virtual artifact
Boyd Wettlaufer, Father of Saskatchewan archaeology

External links
Saskatchewan Archaeological Society Canoe Saskatchewan 
Saskatchewan Archaeological Society - Regina Archaeological Society
Saskatchewan Archaeology
Wanuskewin Heritage Park
Virtual Saskatchewan - Wanuskewin Heritage Park
Park Information St. Victor Petroglyphs
Culture Youth and Recreation | Map of Saskatchewan Archaeology
A Handbook For Teaching Archaeology In Saskatchewan Schools
Culture Youth and Recreation | Heritage

Organizations based in Saskatchewan
Natural history of Saskatchewan
Archaeological organizations
Archaeological professional associations